Sineh-ye Ghaz (also Romanized as Sīnh-ye Ghāz; also known as Sina Khwār, Sīneh Kherār, Sīneh Khrār, and Sīneh-ye Khvār) is a village in Dehaj Rural District, Dehaj District, Shahr-e Babak County, Kerman Province, Iran. At the 2006 census, its population was 44, in 13 families.

References 

Populated places in Shahr-e Babak County